Plainfield is an unincorporated community in St. Joseph County, Indiana, United States. It is along U.S. Route 20 in the north-central part of Olive Township and is bordered to the south and west by the town of New Carlisle.

Geography

References

Unincorporated communities in St. Joseph County, Indiana
Unincorporated communities in Indiana